Bethany House Publishers is a publisher that publishes Christian fiction and non-fiction books. Bethany House Publishers was bought in 2003 by Baker Publishing Group.

Bethany House publishes both historical and contemporary fiction. Historical fiction is considered any book that is set prior to 1950. Contemporary fiction is defined as any book which is set in the last fifty years. Bethany House also publishes nonfiction, covering a broad spectrum of issues relevant to Christianity. (Mettee)

Stats
Bethany House has published over 1,000 books. They publish 120 books per year.

Awards
Bethany House Publishers has received thirty-three Gold or Platinum awards. They have also won twenty-two Christy Awards since the award's inception in 2000.

Notable authors
Sorted alphabetically.

 Stephen Arterburn
 Lynn Austin
 Jim Burns
 T. Davis Bunn
 Anne de Graaf
 Wayne Cordeiro
 Mary Connealy
 Peter Greer
 Dee Henderson
 T.D. Jakes
 Julie Klassen
 Lois Gladys Leppard
 Beverly Lewis
 TobyMac
 Judith Miller
 Michael A. O'Donnell
 Janette Oke
 Robin Parrish
 Judith Pella
 Tracie Peterson
 Leonard Ravenhill
 Lauraine Snelling
 James White

References

External links
 Bethany House Official Site

1966 establishments in Minnesota
Book publishing companies based in Minnesota
Christian publishing companies
Companies based in Bloomington, Minnesota
Publishing companies established in 1966